Chrominae is a subfamily of the family Pomacentridae, which consists of the damselfishes and the clownfishes.

Genera
The following genera are classified in the subfamily Chrominae:

 Azurina D.S. Jordan & McGregor, 1898
 Chromis Cuvier, 1814 
 Dascyllus Cuvier, 1829
 Pycnochromis Fowler, 1941

The genus Pycnochromis, which is not mentioned in the 5th edition of Fishes of the World, has been regarded as a junior synonym of Chromis but is now recognised as a valid genus by some authorities. In addition, the genera Acanthochromis and Altrichthys which the 5th edition of Fishes of the World included in this subfamily have been reclassified as belonging to the Pomacentrinae.

References

 
Pomacentridae
Ray-finned fish subfamilies